Theodor Karl Ernst Adolf Liebknecht (19 April 1870 – 6 January 1948) was a German socialist politician and activist.

Biography
Born in Leipzig in 1870 as the son of Wilhelm Liebknecht and the brother of Karl Liebknecht, Theodor Liebknecht studied law and worked, together with his brother Karl and Oskar Cohn, as a lawyer in Berlin from 1899 on, becoming politically active after his brother's murder in January 1919.

Liebknecht was a member of the Independent Social Democratic Party of Germany (USPD), opposed to the merger with the KPD and the joining of the Comintern but also to the reunification of the party with the SPD, he continued the USPD as an independent party with Georg Ledebour until its merger into the Sozialistische Arbeiterpartei Deutschlands (SAPD, "Socialist Workers' Party of Germany") in 1931.

In 1922 he accompanied Kurt Rosenfeld, Emile Vandervelde and Arthur Wauter as foreign socialist lawyers who participated in the defence of the Socialist Revolutionaries in the 1922 Moscow Trial of Socialist Revolutionaries.

In 1924, he was involved in the split of the Sozialistischer Bund together with Georg Ledebour.

A right-wing member of the SAPD, he was opposed to the introduction of Leninist schemes of organization into the party. Following the NazGeorg Elseri rise to power, he emigrated to Basel, Switzerland in 1933 and was later employed by the International Institute of Social History in Amsterdam from 1936 to 1939. He was a supporter of the 2½ International.

References

1870 births
1948 deaths
Politicians from Leipzig
Independent Social Democratic Party politicians
Socialist Workers' Party of Germany politicians